The 2018 iHeartRadio Music Awards were held on March 11, 2018 at The Forum in Inglewood, California. The list of nominations was announced on January 10, 2018. DJ Khaled and Hailey Baldwin hosted the ceremony. TBS, TNT, and truTV broadcast the ceremony in the United States, while the red carpet was broadcast live on the network's social media pages. The telecast aired following the 2018 NCAA Selection Show on TBS. Taylor Swift premiered the music video for her single "Delicate" at the show. 2018 marked the show's final simulcast on TBS, TNT, and truTV, as it returned to broadcast television the following year, and aired on new partner network FOX for the first time.

Performances
The following performed at the show:

Winners and nominees
iHeartRadio presented the winners of seven categories in the seven days leading up to the Sunday telecast. Winners are highlighted in boldface.

References

2018
2018 in American music
2018 in Los Angeles
2018 music awards
March 2018 events in the United States
Inglewood, California